Romain Sicard (born 1 January 1988) is a French former professional racing cyclist, who rode professionally between 2009 and 2021 for the ,  and  teams.

Career
Born in Bayonne, Sicard won the Tour de l'Avenir and the under 23 World Road Race Championships in 2009, the only man to win both in the same season. In 2010, he joined the Basque UCI ProTour team  as the second ever French national after .

Sicard joined  for the 2014 season, after his previous team –  – folded at the end of the 2013 season.

He announced his retirement in April 2021 due to the diagnosis of a cardiac anomaly.

Major results

2008
 9th Overall Ronde de l'Isard
2009
 1st  Road race, UCI Under-23 Road World UChampionships
 1st  Overall Tour de l'Avenir
1st Stage 8 (ITT)
 1st Subida al Naranco
 1st Stage 2 Ronde de l'Isard
 3rd Overall Tour du Haut-Anjou
 4th Overall Cinturó de l'Empordà
 9th Overall Tour du Loir-et-Cher
 10th Vuelta a La Rioja
2010
 9th Vuelta a La Rioja
 10th Overall Bayern–Rundfahrt
2014
 7th Overall Tour de l'Ain
2015
 5th Time trial, National Road Championships
 6th Overall Vuelta a Castilla y León
2016
 8th Overall Critérium International
2017
 2nd Overall Tour du Gévaudan Languedoc-Roussillon
 5th Tour du Doubs
 7th Overall Tour du Limousin
 8th Overall Settimana Internazionale di Coppi e Bartali
2018
 8th Tour du Gévaudan Occitanie
 10th Classic de l'Ardèche

Grand Tour general classification results timeline

References

External links

1988 births
Living people
French male cyclists
Sportspeople from Bayonne
Cyclists from Nouvelle-Aquitaine